Elections to Watford Borough Council were held on 4 May 2000. One third of the council was up for election and the Labour Party lost overall control of the council to no overall control.

After the election, the composition of the council was:
Labour 18
Liberal Democrat 10
Conservative 8

Election result

References
2000 Watford election result

2000
2000 English local elections
2000s in Hertfordshire